Kheri Lok Sabha constituency is one of the 80 Lok Sabha (parliamentary) constituencies in the Indian state of Uttar Pradesh.

Assembly segments
Presently, Kheri Lok Sabha constituency comprises five Vidhan Sabha (legislative assembly) segments. These are:

Members of Parliament

^ by poll

General Elections Results

2019 Election Results

2014 Election Results

See also
 Kheri
 Lakhimpur Kheri district
 Politics of Lakhimpur Kheri
 List of Constituencies of the Lok Sabha

Notes

Lok Sabha constituencies in Uttar Pradesh
Politics of Lakhimpur Kheri district